El Ché-Cola is a cola soft drink manufactured in France (in Marseille) by the El Ché-Cola Company, which donates 50% of its net profits to NGOs that fight against world hunger.  The cola is guaranteed GMO free, with less sugar than most other colas.

The name is an homage to Che Guevara.

External links
 El Che Cola official website

Cola brands